Paul Darmanin (born 6 November 1940) is a Maltese catholic prelate who served as the Bishop of Garissa in Kenya from 1984 to 2015.

Darmanin was born in Santa Venera Malta on 6 November 1940. He entered the Order of Friars Minor Capuchin and was ordained to the priesthood on 26 March 1966. In 1984 Pope John Paul II appointed him as the Bishop of Garissa in Kenya. He was consecrated by the Archbishop of Malta Joseph Mercieca and co-consecrated by the Archbishop of Cardiff John Ward and Bishop Biagio Vittorio Terrinoni of Marsi.

References

External links

Catholic Hierarchy

Living people
1940 births
20th-century Roman Catholic bishops in Kenya
Maltese Roman Catholic bishops
Maltese expatriates in Kenya
Capuchins
21st-century Roman Catholic bishops in Kenya
Roman Catholic bishops of Garissa